The 2021–22 season was Chelsea Women's 30th competitive season and 12th consecutive season in the FA Women's Super League, the top flight of English women's football.

Squad information

First team squad

Academy players with first-team appearances

New contracts

Transfers and loans

In

Out

Loan out

Management team

{|class="wikitable"
|-
!Position
!Staff
|-
|Manager|| Emma Hayes
|-
|Assistant manager|| Paul Green
|-
|Assistant coach|| Denise Reddy
|-
|Head of technical/Goalkeeping coach|| Stuart Searle
|-
|Head of performance|| Bart Caubergh
|-
|Opposition analyst & coach || Leanne Champ
|-

Kit

Pre-season

Competitions

Women's Super League

League table

Results summary

Results by matchday

Matches

FA Cup

League Cup

Knockout phase

UEFA Women's Champions League

Group stage

Statistics

Appearances and goals

|-
|colspan="16"|Goalkeepers:
|-

|-
|colspan="16"|Defenders:
|-

|-
|colspan="16"|Midfielders:
|-

|-
|colspan="16"|Forwards:
|-

|-
|colspan="16"|Players have left the club:
|-

|-

Goalscorers
Includes all competitive matches. The list is sorted by squad number when total goals are equal.

Assists
Includes all competitive matches. The list is sorted by squad number when total assists are equal.

Clean sheets
Includes all competitive matches. The list is sorted by squad number when total clean sheets are equal.

Disciplinary records
Includes all competitive matches. The list is sorted by squad number when total disciplinary records are equal.

Awards

References

Chelsea F.C. Women seasons
Chelsea F.C. Women
Chelsea F.C Women